FC Grand Pro Varna was a professional futsal team based in Varna, Bulgaria. It played in Bulgarian Futsal Championship. The club was officially founded in 2003 under the name Piccadilly. In 2007 the club called MFC Varna. Club colors are yellow, red and black.

In 2011 MFC Varna became the champion of Bulgaria for the third time, but after unsuccessful participation in the qualifying rounds of the Champions League, at the end of August 2011, the club was officially dissolved.

Achievements
 Champions of Bulgaria: 3 times (2005, 2007, 2009)
 Winner Bulgarian futsal cup: 3 times (2006, 2008, 2009)

Current Squad 2008/09

   
    

Futsal clubs in Bulgaria
Sport in Varna, Bulgaria
Futsal clubs established in 2003
2003 establishments in Bulgaria